Pettus is an unincorporated community in Raleigh County, West Virginia, United States.

The community was named after W. H. Pettus, a businessperson in the coal mining industry.

References 

Unincorporated communities in West Virginia
Unincorporated communities in Raleigh County, West Virginia